The Nowhere Son is an Indian/American independent film written, shot and directed by San Banarje starring Soumitra Chatterjee, Trisha Ray, San Banarje and Biswajit Chakraborty. The film, produced by Next Actor Studio, Houston, was shot in India and United States in cities such as Calcutta, Kashi, Houston, Galveston and New Orleans. 
 The film is listed in movie critic Joe Leydon's list of 'Five movies not to miss at Worldfest Houston'.

Plot 

Physician Sanjay Chakroborty (San Banarje) lives in Calcutta with his professor father Anil (Soumitra Chatterjee) in a centrally-located house owned by their family for decades. The corrupt minister Maity (Biswajit Chakraborty) wants to acquire their plot for making a luxury hotel. However, the professor is against selling the house. Within a few days, Anil goes missing. Now Sanjay gives up everything in search of his father.

Production
 While filming in Kashi (Varanasi), director San Banarje was detained by the local police for pointing the camera at a Hindu temple without permit. He was released after two hours.
 This is the third film that San Banarje and Trisha Ray shot with Soumitra Chatterjee.
 After filming his last feature Bodhisattva in seven days, director San Banarje used a different approach to film "The Nowhere Son," taking almost a year and half to shoot the film, in two different continents.
 Almost every crew including the assistant sound recordist, assistant production manager, unit production manager, and production assistants acted in speaking parts.
 In most of his solo scenes of Director and Cinematographer San Banarje, the camera was often operated by tourists in New Orleans, rickshawpullers in Kolkata, boatmen in Kashi (Banaras), porters in Howrah and sometimes it was kept on a stand while he performed in front of it.
 San Banarje shot a chase scene with himself and two other actors, by operating the camera with his left hand, while the scene was playing out on the right side of the frame.
 Soumitra Chatterjee had to leave town for a few days when San Banarje approached him for doing this film. When San told him that he would not shoot the film without Chatterjee, the legendary actor cancelled his trip to play the part of San's father.
 Trisha Ray edited the film while on chemo to keep her mind distracted from her treatment.
 The film was ready in September 2012 but just before burning the DVD, the hard drive crashed. San Banarje and Trisha Ray drove to Austin to try to get the data out but were told the drive was beyond repair. The rushes had to be digitized and film was recut from scratch, finally finishing in February 2013.
 During the second edit, director San Banarje introduced new characters and fleshed out the story to add layers to the characters.

Cast 
 Soumitra Chatterjee
 San Banarje
 Biswajit Chakraborty
 Trisha Ray
 Samba Banerjee
 Sankar Roy Chowdhury
 Dibyaroop Roy
 Ramasankar Paul
 Suman Nandy
 Sukanto Bhattacharya
 Shahab Peer
 Thiago Paes

Crew 
 Producers : San Banarje and Trisha Ray
 Writer : San Banarje
 Director : San Banarje
 Cinematographer : San Banarje
 Editor : Trisha Ray
 Sound : Gautam Nag
 Music : Gianmarco Leone
 Production Manager : Sambhu Munshi

Screenings 

The film first premiered in Houston at the Worldfest Houston International Film Festival in April 2013 where it was named as "Top Five Not to Miss Movies at Worldfest" by critic Joe Leydon. In June 2013, it played at the Hoboken International Film Festival in New York. Writer-Director San Banarje was interviewed by Garden State Journal prior to the screening. In November 2013, the film was screened at Alexandria, Virginia for Alexandria Film Festival.

References

External links
 
 The Nowhere Son Official Site

Indian drama films
Indian independent films
2013 films
Films shot in Kolkata
English-language Indian films